The Pengbo River is a tributary of the Lhasa River that runs through the western part of Lhünzhub County, Lhasa municipality, Tibet, China.

Location
The Pengbo River is one of the main tributaries of the Lhasa River, located in Lhünzhub County.

Environment
There are three natural forests in the river basin. A 2013 report said that although the Lhasa Municipal Forestry Bureau was undertaking an extensive afforestation program, half of the seedlings planted along the Peng Po river died in the dry season due to sandy soil and lack of water. The valley is home to black-necked cranes, who spend their nights on Hutoushan Reservoir during the winter, foraging in the farmland in the day. A protected area of  has been established for the black-necked cranes. In 1996 there were about 4,000 of the birds, most of whom spent their winters in the valleys of the Nyanga, Lhasa and Pengbo rivers and the middle reaches of the Yarlung Tsangpo.

Irrigation
The river basin contains  of farmland, of which  could be irrigated.
A 1995 report concluded that water deficiency in the Pengbo basin was very high, particularly during the growing season from March to May, and was expected to become worse.
In 2013 a spokesman for the Lhasa City Water Conservancy Bureau said the Peng Po Northern Irrigation canal project would be started that year.

Notes

References

Citations

Sources

 

Rivers of Lhasa
Tributaries of the Brahmaputra River
Lhünzhub County